This is a list of gentlemen's clubs in London, United Kingdom, including those that no longer exist or merged, with an additional section on those that appear in fiction. Many of these clubs are no longer exclusively male.

Extant clubs

Defunct or merged clubs

Fictional clubs
 Bagatelle Card Club – One of Colonel Sebastian Moran's clubs in the Sherlock Holmes story The Adventure of the Empty House.
 Beargarden Club – A St James's club in Trollope's Palliser novels
 Bellona Club – Lord Peter Wimsey's club and location of a murder in Dorothy L. Sayers novel The Unpleasantness at the Bellona Club
 Billiards Club – Setting for the improbably tall tales of Jorkens, by Lord Dunsany
 Black's Club – Jack Aubrey's, Stephen Maturin's, and Sir Joseph Blaine's club in Patrick O'Brian's Aubrey-Maturin series. O'Brian also makes Prince William, Duke of Clarence a member.
 Blades Club – M's club in the James Bond series by Ian Fleming.
 Bratt's Club – John Beaver's club in A Handful of Dust by Evelyn Waugh; Charles Ryder’s club in “ Brideshead Revisited” by Evelyn Waugh; Colonel Charles Russell's club in two of the first three novels by William Haggard.
 Centaur Club – Francis Blake's club in Blake and Mortimer (comics) by Edgar P. Jacobs
 Craven’s – A gaming club founded by the enigmatic Derek Craven, brought to life by author Lisa Kleypas, destroyed by fire in its prime.
 Diogenes Club – Mycroft Holmes's club in the Sherlock Holmes stories.
 Drones Club – Bertie Wooster's club in P. G. Wodehouse's Jeeves stories; and is also the club of several other Wodehouse characters, including Bingo Little, Gussie Fink-Nottle, Psmith, and Freddie Threepwood.
 Etheric Explorers Club – a society featured in a series of short stories and novels by Paul Marlowe.
 Egotist's Club – Lord Peter Wimsey's club in the Dorothy L. Sayers novels and short stories.
 Ffeatherstonehaugh's Club – a corrupt and hedonistic establishment commemorating the libertine values of John Wilmot, 2nd Earl of Rochester, featured in the crime novel Clubbed to Death by Ruth Dudley Edwards.
 Hotch Potch Club – featured in John Galsworthy's The Forsyte Saga.
 Imperial Club – from the 1960s UK television comedy series Bootsie and Snudge, starring Alfie Bass and Bill Fraser.
 Iseeum Club – another featured in John Galsworthy's The Forsyte Saga.
 Jenner’s - a gaming club founded by the rough boxer Ivo Jenner, mentioned in the works of author Lisa Kleypas, later managed by the devilish Lord St. Vincent.
 Junior Ganymede Club – Jeeves's club (for gentlemen's gentlemen) in P G Wodehouse's Jeeves stories.
 Junior Greys, Pall Mall – one of Albert Campion's clubs in Margery Allingham's detective stories.
 Marine Commando Club, Paddington – frequented by Julian and Sandy from the BBC radio comedy Round the Horne. Note that Kenneth Horne's radio alter ego, a member of the Athenaeum, described it as "not my sort of club".
 Old Bohemian Club – "Bunny" and Raffles' club in E. W. Hornung's Raffles stories.
 Pickwick Club – A club founded by Mr. Samuel Pickwick to study human nature in Charles Dickens's first novel.
 Progress Club – a club that "...intended to do great things for Liberal Party . . . and had in truth done little or nothing." in The Prime Minister by Anthony Trollope.
 Puffin's – one of Albert Campion's clubs in Margery Allingham's detective stories.
 Royal Bathers Club - club with Turkish bath of which Major-General Clive Wynne-Candy is a member in "The Life and Death of Colonel Blimp" (1943) by Michael Powell and Emeric Pressburger.
 Senior Conservative Club – features in P.G. Wodehouse's novel Psmith in the City. Although fictional, the description of a large, Conservative-aligned club in Northumberland Avenue tallies perfectly with the real-life Constitutional Club at No.28 and Nevill's Turkish Baths at No.25, "twenty yards from the club's front door" (which baths were also used by Sherlock Holmes and Raffles).
 The Seraphim Club – A private club featured in Gallows Thief by Bernard Cornwell.
 Stoics' Club – George Pendyce's club in The Country House by John Galsworthy.
 The Survivor's Club – featured in the novel The Somnambulist by Jonathan Barnes.
 The Tankerville Club – Featured in two Sherlock Holmes stories.
 Thackeray Club – club in the movie Top Hat from 1935 with Fred Astaire and Ginger Rogers.
 Tweedles Club – club in the movie You Must be Joking 1965, American Films Limited, starring Terry Thomas, Michael Callan, Lionel Jefferies, Denholm Elliott, Wilfrid Hyde White and Bernard Cribbins.
 Whitehall Club – the setting of the murder mystery in the novel Keep It Quiet (1935) by Richard Hull.

Gallery

See also
 Country clubs
 Dining clubs
 List of American gentlemen's clubs
 List of India's gentlemen's clubs

Notes

References
 
 The Gentlemen's Clubs of London by Anthony Lejeune, first published 1979, most recently in 2012 by Stacey International.

Further reading

 Link

External links
 Association of London Clubs
 Seth Alexander Thévoz, Global Clubs Directory

Lists of gentlemen's clubs
Clubs Gentlemen's London's List of